The 1994–95 Elitserien season was the 20th season of the Elitserien, the top level of ice hockey in Sweden. 12 teams participated in the league, and HV 71 Jönköping won the championship, defeating Brynäs IF in the final-games.

Standings

First round

Final round

Playoffs

References

External links
 Swedish Hockey League seasons official site

Swe
1994–95 in Swedish ice hockey
Swedish Hockey League seasons